Clive Uptton (12 March 1911 – 11 February 2006) was a widely regarded British illustrator and painter of landscapes and portraits.

He was born in Islington, London, the son of Clive Upton, who worked for Swain's, the engravers, as a touch-up artist and later for the Daily Mail newspaper.

Clive Uptton was educated at Brentwood Grammar School and Southend Art School before moving to London to attend Central Art School and, later, Heatherley's School of Art. He began contributing professionally at the age of 19 before graduating from Central Art School. When he noticed another artist named Upton was working for the Evening Standard, he added a second "t" to his surname so that their work was not confused. From his studio in Cheapside, Uptton contributed illustrations to most of the major magazines of the day, including the Strand Magazine, Tit-Bits, Good Housekeeping, John Bull and The Sphere.

Between 1940 and 1942 Uptton was the political cartoonist of the Daily Sketch and Sunday Graphic; during the war he also worked for the Ministry of Information producing cartoons and posters. After the war he had a varied career as an illustrator and painter. He was a member of the Chelsea Arts Club, the Savage, and the London Sketch Club.

Clive Uptton lived in west London where he died shortly before his 95th birthday.

References

Clive Uptton (obituary), The Independent, 18 February 2006

External links
Look and Learn Magazine search for Clive Uptton

1911 births
2006 deaths
20th-century English male artists
20th-century English painters
Alumni of the Heatherley School of Fine Art
Artists from London
British illustrators
English landscape artists
English male painters
English portrait painters
People from Islington (district)